Members of the New South Wales Legislative Council who served from 1922 to 1925 were appointed for life by the Governor on the advice of the Premier. This list includes members between the election on 25 March 1922 and the election on 30 May 1925. The President was Fred Flowers.

See also
Second Fuller Ministry

Notes

References

 

Members of New South Wales parliaments by term
20th-century Australian politicians